This is a very incomplete list of Gaelic footballers who have played at senior level for the Cork county team.

List of players

A
 Dinny Allen
 John Allen

B
 Jimmy Barrett
 Declan Barron
 Jimmy Barry-Murphy 
 Derry Beckett

C
 Eoin Cadogan 
 Niall Cahalane
 Graham Canty: Until 2013
 Philip Clifford
 John Coleman
 Colin Corkery
 Denis Coughlan 
 Tadhgo Crowley
 Danny Culloty
 Ray Cummins

D
 Don Davis
 Tony Davis

F
 Shea Fahy

G
 Daniel Goulding: 2006–2016

H
 Con Hartnett
 John Hayes
 Donal Hunt

K
 Derek Kavanagh
 Kevin Kehily
 Humphrey Kelleher
 Paddy Kelly: 2008–2017
 Paul Kerrigan: 13 seasons, 2008–2020 made his senior debut against Kerry in the 2008 Munster SFC final
 Paudie Kissane: Retired aged 33 in 2013, made championship debut aged 28, though was a senior panelist in 2002 and 2003

L
 Dinny Long
 James Loughrey: 2013–2021, also played for Antrim
 Anthony Lynch: Until 2011
 Jack Lynch

M
 Dave McCarthy
 Teddy McCarthy 
 Billy Mackesy 
 Kevin McMahon
 James Masters
 John Miskella: 1999–2011
 Billy Morgan
 Brian Murphy 
 Nicholas Murphy

O
 Alan O'Connor: Until 2013, returned 2015, retired 2017
 Donncha O'Connor: Until 2018
 Kieran O'Connor: 2004-2011
 Kevin O'Driscoll: Until 2021
 Kevin O'Dwyer
 Seán Óg Ó hAilpín 
 Noel O'Leary: 14 years, until 2013
 Colm O'Neill
 Pearse O'Neill
 Diarmuid O'Sullivan
 Kevin Jer O'Sullivan

P
 Jim Power

Q
 Alan Quirke: 1999–2013

S
 Ciarán Sheehan: Until 2021

T
 Larry Tompkins

W
 Aidan Walsh 
 Denis Walsh

Y
 Éamonn Young

See also
 List of Cork inter-county hurlers

References

Players
Footballers
 
Lists of inter-county Gaelic football players